Stančić is a gender-neutral Slavic surname that may refer to
Dino Stančič (born 1992), Slovenian football player
Dragan Stančić (born 1982), Serbian football coach and former football player
Miljenko Stančić (1926–1977), Croatian painter and graphic artist
Svetislav Stančić (1895–1970), Croatian pianist and music pedagogue
International Piano Competition Svetislav Stančić